Guinea-Bissau Television (or TGB) is the state television of the African country of Guinea-Bissau. The headquarters are in the capital city of Bissau. The station's main transmitter is located in Nhacra and covers the Bissau metropolitan area. The system also includes two relay towers, one in the east of the country, in Gabu, and another in the south, in Catió.

History
The installation of the very first television network in Guinea-Bissau began in the 1980s following a public tender won by a Portuguese company. The first broadcasting service went on air in several experimental stages in October 1987, when the initial contract to create a state television was signed.

The television was officially launched in November 1989, under the name Televisão Experimental da Guiné-Bissau (TEGB), through the partnership agreement with Portuguese Radiotelevision (since renamed Rádio e Televisão de Portugal, or RTP). At the time, the country was ruled by João Bernardo Vieira who had seized power in a military coup in 1980, and the day chosen for the official launch coincided with the 9th anniversary of the coup, on 14 November 1989. Until then, Guinea-Bissau only had a radio broadcasting service.

In 1995 the broadcasting service was renamed Rádio e Televisão da Guiné-Bissau (RTGB). During the 1998–99 civil war the station survived, but after the fall of Vieira in 1999, the station began to experience difficulties, mainly financial, and was largely ignored by the new political leaders. In 2003 the station was renamed once again, becoming Televisão da Guiné-Bissau (TGB) with the radio section split into a separate company called Radiodifusão Nacional da Guiné-Bissau (RNGB).

In 2006, TGB, in partnership with the Guinean government, acquired the rights to broadcast 64 matches of the 2006 FIFA World Cup held in Germany. It was the first time in the history of the country's television that a Bissau-Guinean media company acquired the rights to broadcast a football world championship, and it was the first World Cup to feature three Portuguese-speaking national teams: Angola, Brazil and Portugal. TGB reportedly paid US$16,000 (€12,300) for the broadcasting rights.

Until 2006, the station traditionally aired only four hours of programming every day, from 6 pm until 10 pm. On 15 November 2006, a day after its 17th anniversary, the channel moved to a twelve-hour schedule, moving the start of daily broadcast to 10 am.

See also
Media of Guinea-Bissau
National Broadcasting of Guinea-Bissau

References

External links

Television stations in Guinea-Bissau
Portuguese-language television networks
Television channels and stations established in 1987
State media